Alpine pennycress is a common name for several plants and may refer to:

Noccaea montana, native to western North America
Thlaspi caerulescens, native to Europe